Papakht (also Romanized as Pāpakht; also known as Mazra‘eh-ye Pāboţ, Pā Bokht, Pābot, Pābukht, and Pā Takht) is a village in Tarq Rud Rural District, in the Central District of Natanz County, Isfahan Province, Iran. At the 2006 census, its population was 15, in 4 families.

References 

Populated places in Natanz County